A list of notable Swiss painters:

A

Johann Ludwig Aberli
Otto Abt
René Acht
Hans Aeschbacher
Jacques-Laurent Agasse
Heinrich Altherr
Urs Amann
Cuno Amiet
Jost Amman
Werner Andermatt
Albert Anker
Dominique Appia
Dennis Armitage
Hans Asper
René Auberjonois

B
Claudio Baccalà
Victor H. Bächer
Silvia Bächli
Augustin Meinrad Bächtiger
Karl Ballmer
Aimé Barraud
François Barraud
Franz Karl Basler-Kopp
Auguste Baud-Bovy
Ernst Baumann 
Fritz Baumann
Otto Baumberger
Hans Bendel
Hans Eduard von Berlepsch-Valendas
Giuseppe Bernardazzi
Emil Beurmann
Diego Bianconi
Heinrich Bichler
Johann Jakob Biedermann
Max Bill
Edmond Bille
Peter Birkhäuser
Peter Birmann
Samuel Birmann
Johann Heinrich Bleuler
Johann Ludwig Bleuler
François Bocion
Arnold Böcklin
Karl Bodmer
Paul Bodmer
Walter Bodmer
Max Böhlen
Carlo Borer
Marius Borgeaud
Louise-Cathérine Breslau
Serge Brignoni
Arnold Brügger
Hans-Ulrich Brunner
Emanuel Büchel
Franz Bucher
Frank Buchser
Johann Balthasar Bullinger
Jenny Burckhardt
Johann Burger 
Max Buri
Joseph Burkhardt-Born
Eugène Burnand
Carlo Antonio Bussi
Anton Bütler
Joseph Niklaus Bütler
Niklaus Bütler
Johann Rudolf Byss

C
Alexandre Calame
Paul Camenisch
Gianfredo Camesi
Joseph Caspar
Luciano Castelli
Edouard Castres
Coghuf
Luca Antonio Colomba
Giovanni Battista Innocenzo Colombo
Mario Comensoli
Hans Coray
Aloïse Corbaz
Corinne Cuéllar-Nathan

D
Helen Dahm
Heinrich Danioth
Paul Degen
Sandro del Prete
François Diday
Adolf Dietrich
Martin Disler
Martin Disteli
Willi Dreesen
Stéphane Ducret
Henri Dufaux

E
Theo Eble
Ulla Engeberg Killias
Walter Enholtz
Charles l’Eplattenier
Ruth Erat
Hans Erni
André Evard

F
Janika Fabrikant
Hans Falk
Helmut Federle
Franz Fedier
Hermann Feierabend
Hans Ulrich Fisch
Hans Fischer 
Jakob Flach
Annemie Fontana
Sigmund Freudenberger
Ernst Frick
Hans Fries
Pia Fries
Otto Frölicher
Johann Heinrich Füssli

G
Ferdinand Gehr
Franz Gertsch
Salomon Gessner
Alberto Giacometti
Augusto Giacometti
Giovanni Giacometti
Babeli Giezendanner
Hansruedi Giger
H. R. Giger
René Gilsi
Francesco Antonio Giorgioli
Charles Girardet
Fritz Glarner
Charles Gleyre
Theo Glinz
Carl Arnold Gonzenbach
Camille Graeser
Urs Graf der Ältere
Anton Graff
Eugène Grasset
Konrad Grob
Eduard Gubler
Max Gubler
Alis Guggenheim

H
Stefan Haenni
Jakob Emanuel Handmann
Johannes Handschin
Jakob Häne
Eugen Hartung
Willi Hartung
Pierre Haubensak
Max Haufler
Franz Hegi
Georg Friedrich Heilmann
Joseph Heintz der Ältere
Andreas Henzen
Maria Herrmann-Kaufmann
Heinrich Herzig
David Hess 
Ludwig Hess
Hermann Hesse
Charles Hindenlang
Hermann Hirzel
Ferdinand Hodler
Gottfried Honegger
Jean Huber Voltaire
Ernest Hubert
Alain Huck
Daniel Humair
Wilhelm Hummel
Alfonso Hüppi
Johannes Hüppi
Manfred Hürlimann
Britta Huttenlocher

I
Leiko Ikemura
Anna Indermaur
Robert Indermaur
Rolf Iseli

J
Urs Jaeggi
Karl Jauslin

K
Max Kämpf
Adam Dario Keel
Carl Eugen Keel
Albert von Keller
Paul Klee
Rolf Knie
Max Kohler
Rudolf Koller
Franz Niklaus König
Ernst Kreidolf
Christina Krusi
Hans Krüsi

L
Salomon Landolt
Pierre-Louis de La Rive
Le Corbusier
Hans Leu the Elder
Leo Leuppi
Alois Lichtsteiner
Ernst Linck
Carl August Liner
Carl Walter Liner
Walter Linsenmaier
Jean-Étienne Liotard
Carlo E. Lischetti
Verena Loewensberg
Paul Lohse
Urs Lüthi

M
Niklaus Manuel
Barthélemy Menn
Dölf Mettler
Johann Heinrich Meyer
Otto Meyer-Amden
Elvezia Michel-Baldini
Werner Miller
Gottfried Mind
Louis Moilliet
Paul Monnier
Max von Moos
Otto Morach
Ernst Morgenthaler
Fritz Morgenthaler
Didier Mouron
Max von Mühlenen
Heinrich Anton Müller
Josef Felix Müller
Rudolf Münger

O
Max Oertli
Franz K. Opitz
Meret Oppenheim

P
Edmond de Palézieux
Leta Peer
Alfred Heinrich Pellegrini
Alexandre Perrier
Jean Petitot
Niki de Saint Phalle
Celestino Piatti
Otto Pilny
Fritz Pümpin
Karl Pümpin

R
Richard Ranft
Clara von Rappard
Karl Rauber
Maurice Reymond de Broutelles
Sigismund Righini
Louis Léopold Robert
Charles Rollier
Rüdisühli
Hermann Rüdisühli
Christoph Rütimann

S
 Claude Sandoz 
Edouard-Marcel Sandoz
Hans Sandreuter
Johann Rudolph Schellenberg
Hermann Scherer
Wilhelm Scheuchzer
Robert Schiess
Klaudia Schifferle
Erna Schillig
Alfons Schilling
Wilhelm Schmid
Gérard Ernest Schneider
Johann Robert Schürch
Carlos Schwabe
Albert Schweizer
Peter Schweri
Giovanni Segantini
Gregorius Sickinger
Ota Šik
Caroline Sophie Sordet-Boissonnas
Louis Soutter
Jeronimus Spengler
Anita Spinelli
Adolf Stäbli
Otto Staiger
Karl Stauffer-Bern
Johann Gottfried Steffan
David Eduard Steiner
Eduard Stiefel
Tobias Stimmer
Ernst Stückelberg
Bernhard Studer 
Frédéric Studer
Hans Sturzenegger
Max Sulzbachner

T
Sophie Taeuber-Arp
Gaudenz Taverna
André Thomkins
Jean Tinguely
Anna Maria Tobler
Wolfgang-Adam Töpffer
Niele Toroni
Albert Trachsel
Anne Marie Trechslin
Johann Heinrich Troll
Otto Tschumi

V
Giovanni Antonio Vanoni
Benjamin Vautier
Auguste Veillon
Egon von Vietinghoff
René Villiger
Julius Voegtli
Ludwig Vogel
Denise Voïta
Joseph Simon Volmar

W
Andreas Walser
Karl Walser
Anna Waser
August Weckesser
Walter Wegmüller
Johann Caspar Weidenmann
Charlotte Weiss
Albert Welti
Albert J. Welti
Lisa Wenger
Marianne von Werefkin
Joseph Werner
Walter Kurt Wiemken
Jean Willi
Uwe Wittwer
Emanuel Witz
Konrad Witz
Caspar Wolf
Theodor Wolf
Adolf Wölfli
Fritz Wucherer
Melchior Wyrsch
Franz Anatol Wyss

Z
Eugen Zardetti
Rémy Zaugg
Adrian Zingg
Robert Zünd
Markus Zürcher
Irène Zurkinden

Sources
German Wikipedia